Eric Herman (born Eric Herman Endres, June 14, 1969) is an American children's music performer based in Richland, Washington, United States. His music combines various styles of rock music with often wryly humorous kid-related lyrics to create what he refers to as "cool tunes for kids." Popular songs of his include the viral YouTube hit, "The Elephant Song", "There's a Monster in My House", "Blackbeard, Bluebeard and Redbeard" and "Cowboy Bergaleoukaleopaleous".

Herman performed with Western New York area rock bands including Ember and The Infydels, and he was a regular performer on the Buffalo area acoustic singer/songwriter and live theater scenes. In 2003 a successful production of a musical comedy he wrote, A Week in the Life, was staged at the Alleyway Theater in Buffalo, New York, earning him an Artie Award nomination as "Best Actor in a Musical".  But with the success of his first album of music for kids, The Kid in the Mirror, Herman decided to devote his full attention to producing and performing kids' music under the act name Eric Herman and the Invisible Band. His second album, Monkey Business, proved even more successful, with Seattle's Victory Music Review calling it "one of the best kids' records ever".  He has since released several other CDs to further acclaim.

Eric Herman songs and videos have been heard and seen nationally on PBS Kids, The Today Show, Sirius XM and Fox & Friends. His song "Blackbeard, Bluebeard and Redbeard] was voted "Best Children's Song" by the international Just Plain Folks Music Organization for their 2006 awards, and he received a Parents' Choice Award for his What a Ride! and Incredibly Spaced-Out Adventures of Jupiter Jackson albums. Eric's music videos have become extremely popular, with over 50 million views on YouTube, led by "The Elephant Song", which was featured by YouTube in May 2007. In 2010 "The Elephant Song" was covered by the duo, Victor and Leo, for the CD/DVD release "XSPB 10" by Brazilian superstar, Xuxa, and his video for "The Tale of the Sun and the Moon" was featured prominently in a scene of the Warner Bros. movie Life as We Know It. Eric's songs have been regular top sellers on the popular indie music site, CDBaby, at one time holding 8 of the top 10 spots.

Several of Herman's songs have words written by or with noted children's poetry author, Kenn Nesbitt (who has also provided voice characters for some recordings, including the voice of Bluebeard on "Blackbeard, Bluebeard and Redbeard"), and Herman credits his wife, Roseann, with co-writing many of his songs and co-producing his albums.  Roseann, also cited as Eric's PR manager, died in 2013 after a long illness. Herman has also collaborated with children's musician Eric Ode for the song "My Lucky Day" and singer/songwriter Steve Brown for the song "How to Move a Monster." Guest artists appearing on Eric Herman recordings include Sam Payne ("Scat Cat"), Keith Grimwood and Ezra Idlet of Trout Fishing in America (band) ("The Incredibly Spaced-Out Adventures of Jupiter Jackson"), Roger Day ("Electrical Storm"), Gwendolyn (artist) Sanford of Gwendolyn and the Good Time Gang ("Come Play"), Jim Dague of Scribblemonster ("How to Move a Monster"), The Hughes Brothers ("Cowboy Bergaleoukaleopaleous"), Robbi K ("How Big"), Jen Marco Handy ("This Little Light of Mine"), Ryan Tilby ("Carseat Snack"), Josh Dutton of The Duttons ("What a Ride"), Tito Uquillas of The Hipwaders ("Time Machine") and Mr. Billy ("How to Move a Monster").

Between 2006 and 2010, Eric Herman hosted the "Cool Tunes for Kids" blogsite, with interviews and features about other noted kids' music artists, such as Trout Fishing in America (band), Ralph's World, Imagination Movers and They Might Be Giants, as well as articles by Herman about his experiences working in the kids' music field.

In 2011, Eric expanded his performance options to include a live band, known as Eric Herman and the Thunder Puppies.  Band members as of 2015 are Chris Baugh (bass/vocals), Ben Macy (keyboard/accordion), Dave Pettey (guitar/vocals), and Javier Ruiz (drums/vocals).  The band collaborated on the song "A Million Ways to Play" from Party Animal, and released a full album, Bubble Wrap, in 2016.  Herman often includes his daughters, Becca and Evee, as part of his live shows.

Shortly after the 2016 release of Bubble Wrap, The Thunder Puppies officially disbanded due to scheduling conflicts. Eric continues to tour with Dave Pettey (Guitar/Bass/Percussion) and Ben Macy (Piano/Keyboard/Accordion) as a three-piece band.

Discography 
The Kid in the Mirror (2003)
Monkey Business (2005)
Snow Day! (2006)
Snail's Pace (2007)
What a Ride! (2009)
The Elephant DVD (2011)
Party Animal (2014)
The Incredibly Spaced-Out Adventures of Jupiter Jackson (comedy sketch album) (2014)
Bubble Wrap (with the Thunder Puppies) (2016)
The Eric Herman Strikes Back - DVD (2017)
Magic Beans (2022)

References

External links 
Eric Herman website

1969 births
Living people
Latter Day Saints from New York (state)
Musicians from Buffalo, New York
Converts to Mormonism
Latter Day Saints from Washington (state)
American male singer-songwriters
American children's musicians
Singer-songwriters from New York (state)